Gajendra Verma (born 20 April 1990) is an Indian singer, composer, lyricist and sound recordist. He came under the spotlight when he claimed that his song, titled "Emptiness", also known as "Tune Mere Jaana", which he had composed seven and a half years before, leaked on the internet with a fake sympathetic story of a dying IIT student named Rohan Rathore. The song was viewed over 40 million times on YouTube. His 2018 song, Tera Ghata, has over 450+ million YouTube views.

Early life 
Gajendra Verma was born on 20 April 1990 in Sirsa, Haryana. He was raised in Jaipur, Rajasthan. His father Surender Verma is a well-known poet and theatre personality.

His elder brother Vikram Singh is a music producer, music director and composer. His first song "Tune Mere Jaana" was released with support from SONOTEK (Haryana Famous Music Channel).

Career
Gajendra Varma started his career in 2008, with the song, "Tune Mere Jaana" also called 'Emptiness'.

Gajendra Verma's upcoming music video 'Sun Baliye' sung by Gajendra Verma, Sonu Kakkar. The music video features Gajendra Verma And Apoorva Arora.

Discography

References

External links

 
 

Bollywood playback singers
Living people
Indian film score composers
Indian male playback singers
1990 births
Indian male film score composers

People from Sirsa, Haryana
Indian male singer-songwriters
Singers from Haryana